The Jos. Gunderson House is a historic house at 983 Centre Street in Newton, Massachusetts.  The two story wood-frame house was built c. 1850, and is an extremely rare example of a Regency variant of Greek Revival styling.  This particular type of styling was rarely built outside Boston, and is one of only two known in Newton.  The front facade consists of recessed panels, which alternate with projecting sections to emulate the appearance of pilasters that lack a typical capital element.  The second story windows have wrought iron railings, also a Regency feature.

The house was listed on the National Register of Historic Places in 1986.

See also
 National Register of Historic Places listings in Newton, Massachusetts

References

Houses on the National Register of Historic Places in Newton, Massachusetts
Houses completed in 1850
Greek Revival architecture in Massachusetts